Ernest Edward Foord (3 June 1883 – 28 October 1941) was an English professional golfer. He emigrated to America in 1916 and was known there as Ernest or Ernie Ford.

Golf career in England
Foord was the son of Walter Foord, the professional at Burnham & Berrow Golf Club. He replaced his father as professional and remained there from 1900 to 1916. Foord was a regular competitor in the Open Championship from 1901 to 1914. His best finish was tied for 19th place in 1914. After the Western section of the PGA was formed in 1909 he reached the final stages of the News of the World Match Play in 1909, 1910 and 1912. In both 1910 and 1912 he won two matches to reach the quarter-final stage.

Golf career in the United States
Foord emigrated to the United States in 1916. In America he was known as Ernest or Ernie Ford. He was the professional at Plum Hollow Country Club and at Oakland Hills Country Club from 1924 to 1930. He moved to Flint, Michigan in 1930 when he lived until his death.

Personal life
Foord married Ada Gard in England in 1909. He died in 1941, Ada in 1985. They had a son Stanley Ernest, born in 1909, who was also a golfer. Foord had a younger brother, Fred (1889–1945), who was a professional golfer and also emigrated to America. Fred also used the Ford spelling in America.

Results in major championships

Note: Foord only played in The Open Championship.

WD = withdrew
CUT = missed the half-way cut
"T" indicates a tie for a place

References

English male golfers
People from Burnham-on-Sea
English emigrants to the United States
1883 births
1941 deaths